Jabal Atherb is a mountain in Bareq, Saudi Arabia. The mountain consist primarily of sedimentary rock of Jurassic, Cretaceous, and Tertiary origin.

Climate and agriculture 
The mountain has the highest average rainfall of Saudi Arabia due to largely seasonal rain. Average rainfall can range from ) to over ) per year.

See also 
 List of mountains in Saudi Arabia
 Sarat Mountains
 'Asir Mountains
 Tihamah

References 

Populated places in Bareq
Atherb